Rafa Nadal Tennis is a tennis video game, developed by VirtualToys and published by Codemasters. It was released for the Nintendo DS in January 2007 and on the Wii December 27. The game features tennis athlete Rafael Nadal on the cover and primarily focuses around the sport of tennis.

The player must use the stylus to hit the tennis ball and do tricks. The game has a career mode in which there are 20 tournaments at 17 international locations for the player to compete in and multiplayer mode in which up to four people can play. There is also a training school to learn how to do tricks.

References 
Codemaster's official website (Rafa Nadal Tennis)
More information on Rafa Nadal Tennis

External links 
Codemasters website

2007 video games
Codemasters games
Nintendo DS games
Rafael Nadal
Tennis video games
Wii games
Video games based on real people
Nadal
Nadal
Video games developed in the United Kingdom